Rhododendron beyerinckianum is a rhododendron species native to Indonesia and western Papua New Guinea, extending as far east as Mount Victoria and Mount Dayman, where it grows at altitudes of 1400–4000 meters. It is a shrub that grows to 5 m in height, with leathery leaves that are narrowly ovate, 6 x 3.5 cm in size. Flowers are tubular-funnel-shaped and usually dark red, but also white, yellow, greenish or pink.

References 
 Nova Guinea 8:876, t. 150. 1912.
 Plants of the World Online
 
 Vireya.net
 Hirsutum.com
 Atkinson, R., K. Jong & G. Argent, "Chromosome numbers of some tropical rhododendrons (section Vireya)", Edinburgh J. Bot. 57(1): 1–7. 2000.
 Isotype of Rhododendron beyerinckianum Koord. var. longipetiolatum J.J.Sm.

beyerinckianum
Taxa named by Sijfert Hendrik Koorders